Crucifixion with Two Angels is a tempera and gold on panel painting by Paolo Uccello, executed c. 1423, now in a private collection.

References

Uccello
1423 paintings
Paintings by Paolo Uccello
Paintings of the Virgin Mary
Paintings depicting John the Apostle